August Hugo Vogel (1862–1930) was vice-president of Pfister & Vogel leather tannery of Milwaukee, Wisconsin.

Additional involvement
He was president of the Milwaukee University School, chairman of the board of trustees of Milwaukee-Downer College, a director and vice-president of the Visiting Nurse association, a trustee and former president of St. Johns Home for the Aged, and senior warden and treasurer of the endowment fund of St. James Episcopal church. He was a charter member and first president of the University Club of Milwaukee.

He was one of the "industrial leaders of the nation" and attended conferences that lead to the creation of the United States Chamber of Commerce. He was also director of Chamber of Commerce of the United States 1912–1914 his successor was L. J. Petit.

For several years he served as the director of the Tanner's council.
Director of the Milwaukee Association for Commerce.
Director of the Federal Reserve Bank of Chicago.
Regional adviser of the war industries board.
Vice Chairman of Milwaukee County council of defense.
Chairman of Liberty Loan campaigns.

Incorporating the Village of Chenequa
Vogel was instrumental in the incorporation of the village of Chenequa, Wisconsin. Due to his recent testimony in court regarding his village residency, his will was required to be refiled in Waukesha County after he died.

Pine Lake residence on Vogel Bay
His Chenequa residence was designed by Alexander C. Eschweiler.

About half a mile south of the West bay a smaller bay indents the west shore of Pine Lake. On its north shore is the residence designed by Eschweiler and in its rear the Vogel farm and Pauline's Wood Co. property referred to as the clubhouse. The Paulines wood property was the summer residences of Mrs. Emilie Nunnemacher, Mrs. Hedwig Earth and Mr. and Mrs. August C. Helmholz.

This Pauline's Woods property was the former homestead of William Schuchardt, who settled here in 1852, and was sold after his death to the late Rudolph Nunnemacher who named the site after his wife, Pauline. It was then purchased by Frederick Vogel, Senior, in 1885, whose descendants had resided there. It is often referred to as the Vogel Clubouse.

The Vogel Bay site has historical significance because the Potawatomi Indian West Shore Trail passed through the area. At the head of this bay hearthstones and a few flint chips were found in the rear of a small cottage in a spot from which the sod had recently been removed. Others were found on the adjoining cultivated field of the Vogel farm. At least one Indian wigwam was at some time located here. A few flint points and a chert pecking hammer have been picked up in this field.

The former Vogel family summer clubhouse was called Pauline's Woods. Chenequa still has a private road with this name.

Vogel State Park

Vogel State Park of Blairsville, Georgia consists of land donated to create the state park in 1927 by August H. Vogel and his brother Fred Vogel, Jr. The Vogel family harvested bark from oak and hemlock trees located on thousands of acres they owned in North Georgia.  The bark was shipped to Wisconsin and used by the company for tanning leather. During World War I, a synthetic method to tan leather was developed so there was no further need for the north Georgia resources.

References

1862 births
1930 deaths
People from Chenequa, Wisconsin
Businesspeople from Wisconsin
American city founders
Place of birth missing
Milwaukee-Downer College